The Country Rugby League of New South Wales (CRL), formed in 1934 and disbanded in 2019, was the governing body for the sport of rugby league football in areas of New South Wales outside the Sydney metropolitan area until it merged with NSW Rugby League in 2019. The CRL was superseded by 6 NSWRL Country Divisions represented by 4 members of the nine-person NSWRL board. Despite its name, the CRL also governed rugby league in the Australian Capital Territory.  Apart from selecting a Country Origin side to play in the annual City vs Country Origin game, the CRL administered many senior and junior competitions across the state.

History

Newcastle was the first city outside Sydney to start a league competition, being involved in the Sydney Premiership in 1908–09 and then starting their own competition in 1910.
(Other country areas were playing "football" before this time, which should be referenced. A photograph exists of the Bowraville team of 1907 who presumably played other teams in the district. If the team played Rugby Union, some reference should be made in this History section as to when this region converted to Rugby League.   
Local research required since early editions of the local newspaper are not in the National Archives.)

On 11 February 1911, the Hunter District Rugby Football League (HDRFL) was established at a large meeting in Maitland, thus becoming the first branch of the NSW Rugby League in "the bush" (i.e. outside the urban centres of Sydney and Newcastle). The HDRFL territory encompassed a lower part of the Hunter Valley from Singleton down to the Maitland district and towns on the nearby coalfields (the major ones being Cessnock, Kurri Kurri and Weston). Competition games were scheduled to kick off on 13 May but were pushed back to 20 May when clubs complained they had not had enough time to practice the new code. In the first senior-grade games played, West Maitland def. Kurri Kurri (12–0) and Cessnock def. Morpeth (23–0) in a double-header on the enclosed Albion Ground at Maitland. The first City v. Country match (advertised as such by the NSWRL in the Sydney Morning Herald of 10/6/1911) was played at the Sydney Agricultural Ground on that same Saturday, with City winning 29–8. The Country team was composed exclusively of players from the Newcastle ("Northern") and the Hunter competitions. The first ever country divisional match (described as such in the Maitland Daily Mercury of 31/7/1911) was played at Newcastle on 29/7/1911 between Newcastle and Hunter. Newcastle won 29–14. The first NSW Country team to tour was a squad of 17 players (12 from Newcastle and 5 from Hunter) that played three matches in Queensland between 5/8/1911 and 12/8/1911, defeating the Queensland State side twice and a Queensland Country representative side once. They then travelled to Sydney to play the Sydney Metropolitan team, again winning 31–24.

On 13 May 1911, another branch of the NSWRL was established in the Wollongong area.

In 1911, a Goldfields' League was formed in West Wyalong, and games were played in Tamworth, Aberdeen, and along the South Coast. The game was introduced to Orange in 1912 and spread quickly through the western districts. In 1913 branch leagues were formed at Bathurst, Dubbo, Nowra, and Tamworth.

In 1920, the NSWRL set up a Country Committee. NSW Country was divided into six sections: South Coast, Northern Districts, Central Northern Districts, Western Districts, Southern, and North Coast. The group system was introduced in 1922, with neighbouring towns being organised into 12 groups.

The Country Rugby League (CRL) was officially formed in 1934, "subject to the NSW Rugby League still being the paramount institution."

In 1939 a dispute arose between the CRL and the NSWRL. The CRL wanted a new administration structure, an equal partnership in which the NSWRL looked after league in Sydney, and the CRL looked after it in the bush. When their proposal was rejected the CRL broke away from the NSWRL for a week, but returned to the fold with a promise that a committee would be set up to sort things out. Eventually the CRL gave in on the grounds that it was in no one's best interests to have the game divided during the war.

The NSWRL and CRL have since cooperated in the running of Rugby league in NSW, including various 'joint ventures' such as the Ron Massey Cup which features three teams from areas under the control of the CRL.

On 24 August 2018, the NSWRL and CRL announced that they had entered into a Memorandum of Understanding (MOU) which will involve formal discussions in relation to a possible merger that would see a merger of the two organisations. This would result with Rugby League in NSW governed by one body for the first time in more than 80 years.

In October 2019 merged with the NSWRL after the NSWRL agreed a new constitution and the CRL voted to wind up its affairs immediately.  The decisions made on 19 October and merger mean that the aim of a unified administration of the sport in NSW was achieved over a year ahead of time.

Regions
The CRL administered the following senior competitions:

Region 1 – East Coast Dolphins
Northern Rivers Division (Group 1 and 18's Merger)*
Group 2 (Northern Mid North Coast)*
Group 3 (Southern Mid North Coast)*
Hastings League (Mid North Coast Second Tier)

Region 2 – Greater Northern Tigers
Group 4 (Western New England)*
Group 19 (New England)*
Group 21 (Hunter)*

Region 3 – Bidgee Bulls (Riverina & Monaro Colts)
Canberra Division 
Group 8 (George Tooke Shield)
Group 9 (Wagga Wagga and Districts)*
Group 16 (Far South Coast)*
Group 17 (Western Riverina Community Cup)
Group 20 (Griffith and Districts)*

Region 4 – Western Rams
Peter McDonald Premiership (Groups 10 & 11 First Grade)*
Group 10 (Central West)
Group 11 (Dubbo and Districts)
Group 12 (Outback RL)
Group 14 (Castlereagh Cup)
Group 15 (Barwon Darling RL)
Woodbridge Cup (Central West Division 2)
Mid-West Cup (Central West Division 3)

Region 5 – Greater Southern
Illawarra Division*
Group 7 (South Coast & Southern Highlands)*

Region 6 – Newcastle & Central Coast
Central Coast Division*
Newcastle Division*
Newcastle & Hunter Rugby League 

* = Top-level Country leagues; Premiers eligible for Clayton Cup as best regional team in the state.

NRL Victoria Competitions Involving NSW Teams
Murray Cup
Sunraysia-Riverlands Rugby League

Disbanded Groups
 Group 1 Rugby League – merged with Group 18 to form Northern Rivers Regional Rugby League (still hold junior competitions)
 Group 5 Rugby League – now forms part of Group 19
 Group 8 Rugby League – merged with Group 19 (Canberra) in 1980 to form ACTRL and CDRL, which formed Canberra Rugby League in 1982
 Group 13 Rugby League – now part of the Group 9 Rugby League in Region 3 (Bidgee Bulls)
 Group 18 Rugby League – merged with Group 1 to form Northern Rivers Regional Rugby League (still holds junior competitions) 
 Group 19 Rugby League (1950-1970) - Southern Tablelands, merged into Group 16 in c.1978-79
 Group 19 Rugby League (1974-1979) - Canberra district, merged with Group 8 in 1980 to form ACTRL and CDRL, which formed Canberra Division in 1982
 Sunraysia-Riverlands Rugby League (reformed briefly as a singular side in 1997 in Group 12, later reformed by the Victorian Rugby League).

Team of the Century
In 2008, rugby league football's centenary year in Australia, the Country Rugby League named its 'Team of the Century':
Clive Churchill (Central Newcastle)
Brian Carlson (North Newcastle)
Eddie Lumsden (Kurri Kurri)
Michael Cronin (Gerringong)
Graeme Langlands (Wollongong)
Bob Fulton (Wests Wollongong)
Andrew Johns (Cessnock)
Steve Roach (Wests Wollongong)
Ian Walsh (Condobolin)
Glenn Lazarus (Queanbeyan Blues)
Herb Narvo (North Newcastle)
Bradley Clyde (Belconnen United)
Wally Prigg (Wests Newcastle/Centrals Newcastle)

Junior competitions
 Andrew Johns Cup – named after Andrew Johns,  made up of players aged under 16 from NSW-based clubs and includes both junior regional representative teams and junior teams of National Rugby League (NRL).
 Laurie Daley Cup – named after Laurie Daley, the competition includes both junior representative teams from regional rugby league clubs and junior teams of National Rugby League clubs, made up players under 18.

Player of the Year Award

See also
List of CRL clubs

References

External links

Rugby League clubs in New South Wales

Rugby league governing bodies in New South Wales
Rugby league in the Australian Capital Territory
Rug
1934 establishments in Australia
Sports organizations established in 1934
2019 disestablishments in Australia
Sports organizations disestablished in 2019